In cooking, a consommé is a type of clear soup made from richly flavoured stock or broth that has been clarified, a process that uses egg whites to remove fat and sediment.

Consommé has three English pronunciations: traditionally in the UK, the stress is on the middle syllable; in modern UK English, the stress is on the first; and in the US the stress is on the last.

Cooking and serving

A consommé is made by adding a mixture of ground meats, together with mirepoix (a combination of carrots, celery, and onion), tomatoes, and egg whites into either bouillon or stock. The key to making a high-quality consommé is simmering; the act of simmering, combined with frequent stirring, brings impurities to the surface of the liquid, which are further drawn out due to the presence of acid from the tomatoes. Eventually, the solids begin to congeal at the surface of the liquid, forming a 'raft', which is caused by the proteins in the egg whites. Once the 'raft' begins to form, the heat is reduced, and the consommé is simmered at a lower heat until it reaches the desired flavour, which usually takes anywhere from 45 minutes to over an hour. The resulting concoction is a clear liquid that has either a rich amber colour (for beef or veal consommé) or a very pale yellow colour (for poultry consommé). It is then carefully drawn from the pot and passed again through a filter to ensure its purity, and is then put through a lengthy process where all of the visible fat is skimmed from the surface. To ensure total purification, the consommé can be refrigerated, which draws out remaining fat, which can easily be skimmed off with a cheesecloth. Alternatively, the consommé can be placed in a wide, shallow container such as a sauté pan or large bowl and wide strips of parchment paper can be dragged along the surface; the tiny amounts of remaining fat adhere to the parchment, leaving the consommé perfectly de-greased. Cartilage and tendons should be left on the meat because of the gelatin they contain, which enhances the mouthfeel of the soup. If beef or veal is used, shin meat is ideal because it is very low in fat and very high in gristle, and although it is undesirable for most other purposes, it is near essential for the flavour of the consommé. The meat is best if it is ground very fine, as if for a mousseline.

Consommés are usually served piping hot because they tend to cool down more quickly than other soups and form a gel. They are most often served with garnishes, which vary in complexity from a simple splash of sherry or egg yolk, to cut vegetables, to shaped savory custards called 'royales'.

This low yield is part of what has traditionally given consommé its refined reputation as an expensive dish.

Other types of consommé such as tomato consommé are traditionally served chilled, which keeps the clearness of the consommé.

Varieties
Double consommé is a consommé made to double strength. There are at least three methods of producing a double consommé, the first of which is doubling the quantity of meat used in the recipe, the second of which is producing a normal strength consommé and reducing it to half its volume, and the third of which is producing a consommé with all water in the recipe replaced with equal quantities of an already-prepared consommé.  It is often found in other cold-cuisine items, especially those that use aspic, or natural gelatin.

Another common variation is chilled or jellied consommé.  They are served cold and thickened naturally by the gelatin extracted from the bones when the original stock is made.  The gelatin gives the consommé a gelatinous texture when set to cool.  Additional gelatin may be added during the last part of the clarification process to ensure that it sets properly.

Consommé madrilène is a clear soup that is pure and clean-tasting, typically flavored with tomato, and served chilled.

Gelatin-filtered "consommé"
In a 2007 New York Times article, Harold McGee popularized an alternative method for clarifying broths, originating among chefs of the molecular gastronomy movement: gelatin filtration. Gelatin-filtration is a novel method of clarification, relying on some of the properties of a super-saturated solution of gelatin, created by freezing, to remove macroscopic particles that cause cloudiness from a water-based stock. This method is distinct from traditional consommé both in technique and in final product, as gelatin filtration results in a gelatin-free broth, while traditional consommé gives a final product rich in gelatin, with a correspondingly rich mouthfeel.

Freezing a water-based solution converts all bulk water into ice crystals, but water associated with solutes—in the case of a soup stock, gelatin, fat, and flavor compounds—remains unfrozen to much lower temperatures; in practice, the freezing temperature of this associated water is well below the reach of conventional freezers. Thus, gelatin filtration works by freezing a gelatin-containing, water-based solution and then allowing it to thaw in a mesh strainer at just above the freezing temperature of water. The gelatin and other solutes concentrate in the unfrozen, associated water, and the gelatin forms a stable network through cross-linking, just as it would in a standard gel. This stable network acts as a filter, trapping large particles of fat or protein, while allowing water and smaller, flavor-active compounds to pass. As the bulk water melts, it passes first through the gelatin network and then through the mesh strainer, into a receiving vessel. Because the temperature is kept just above the freezing point, the bulk water melts slowly and, as it is strained into a separate vessel, it is never in contact with the gelatin for long enough to begin dissolving the gelatin network. After all of the bulk water melts, the gelatin network remains in the strainer with the trapped macroscopic particles, and the clarified stock (the bulk water and flavor compounds) is collected in the receiving vessel.

Because gelatin-filtered consommés do not require a creation of an egg-white raft as in traditional consommés, they are less wasteful. The technique is also applicable to a wider range of "stocks": since no heating is required, heat-sensitive materials, such as fruit juices, can be clarified by first adding a small amount of gelatin, then applying gelatin filtration. A number of non-traditional consommés, not based on stock, have been created using this method, including a "pretzel consommé", a "Doritos consommé", a "brown butter consommé", and a "spiced pumpkin consommé".

Loss of gelatin essential to gelatin filtration results in a consommé with significantly less-rich mouthfeel than a traditional consommé, and also affects the properties of the consommé upon chilling. A traditional consommé gels when chilled, while a gelatin-filtered consommé does not.

History
Clarified broths called consommés have been in use since the Middle Ages, taking many forms from simple soups, to soups made from the meat of a wide variety of less-common animals.

A special type of consommé that was boiled solely with tendons and cartilage without the addition of salt was sweetened, flavoured with fruits and served as dessert. These sweetened consommé creations are essentially the forerunners of present-day gelatin desserts.

See also
 List of French soups and stews
 List of soups
 Broth

References

External links

French soups